Cyclamen pseudibericum (incorrectly spelled pseudoibericum), the false Iberian cyclamen, is a species of flowering plant in the genus Cyclamen of the family Primulaceae, native to the Amanus or Nur and Anti-Taurus Mountains in southern Turkey. It is similar to Cyclamen coum, but with longer petals.

Description
The tuber develops roots from the center below. The leaves are longer than wide, with a hastate or Christmas-tree pattern in green and silver. The spring-blooming flowers with five reflexed, upswept petals, are fragrant and magenta-purple or pink, with a darker blotch and a white zone at the end of the nose (larger than that of C. coum). After flowering, a pod develops on a coiled stem that rests on the ground, releasing its seeds directly on to the soil surface.

This plant has gained the Royal Horticultural Society's Award of Garden Merit (confirmed 2017).

Subdivisions

Forms
There are two naturally occurring forms, distinguished by predominant flower color. C. pseudibericum f. pseudibericum is magenta-purple and C. pseudibericum f. roseum is light pink to nearly white.

Hybrids
Cyclamen × schwarzii Grey-Wilson is a fertile hybrid of Cyclamen pseudibericum × Cyclamen libanoticum. This hybrid can cross back with one of the parents. According to Grey-Wilson some very pale forms of C. pseudibericum f. roseum could actually be C. ×schwarzii or a back-cross of it.

References

External links

Cyclamen Society

pseudibericum